Kangra Valley is a river valley situated in the Western Himalayas. It lies in the state of Himachal Pradesh in India, and is a popular tourist destination. The Kangri dialect is spoken there. 
Dharamshala, the headquarters of Kangra district and the main city of the valley, lies on the southern spur (lateral ridge) of Dhauladhar.

History

The valley witnessed a devastating 7.8 magnitude earthquake at 6:19 am on 4 April 1905, as a result of which about 19,800 people were killed and thousands were injured in the Kangra area. Most buildings in towns of Kangra, Mcleodganj and Dharamshala were destroyed. the Tedha Mandir, in Jawalamukhi is also a victim of Earthquake 1905.

Geography
The valley is filled with numerous perennial streams, which irrigate the valley, and the river Beas flows through this valley. The valley has an average elevation of 2000 ft. Kangra Valley is a strike valley and extends from the foot of the Dhauladhar range to the south of river Beas. The highest peak on the Dhauladhar, White Mountain, marks the boundary between the valley and Chamba, and reaches .

Climate

Most of the valley has a humid subtropical climate (Cwa). Summer starts in early April and peaks in May. From June to mid-September is the monsoon season, when the valley receives very high amounts of rainfall. Autumn is mild and lasts from October to the end of November. Winters are cold and last till late February. Snowfall is common in the hills and higher reaches of the valley during this time. Snow in the lower elevations of the valley is rare, but has been recorded occasionally. Western disturbances cause winter precipitation. Winters are followed by a short, pleasant spring.

Language
A distinct regional dialect, Kangri, is spoken in Kangra valley.

Important towns
Baijnath 
Dharamshala
Kangra
Palampur 
Nagrota Bagwan
Yol

Transport

Road
National highways 154 and 503 are the national highways that pass through the valley, connecting it with other parts of Himachal Pradesh and the neighbouring state of Punjab. Several state highways also connect the valley.

Railway

Kangra Valley Railway is a 164 km long narrow gauge railway line that connects the valley with Pathankot, the nearest railhead on  broad gauge railway network.

Airport

Gaggal Airport, alternatively known as Kangra Airport or Dharamsala-Kangra Airport, is an airport located at Gaggal in Kangra Valley. It is located 14 km southwest of Dharamshala.

Tourism

The main town in the valley and the capital of the district, Dharamshala, is one of the most visited hill stations in Himachal Pradesh and India. It also acts as a base for several Himalayan treks in the Dhauladhars, including Triund which is one of the most famous treks in India. Mcleodganj is the current residence of the Dalai Lama and the centre of Tibetan community in exile in India, and draws tourists from all over the world. Palampur and Dharamshala are also famous for their tea gardens where Kangra tea is grown. Bir is well known for adventure sports, particularly paragliding.

References

Further reading
Hutchinson, J. & J. PH Vogel (1933). History of the Panjab Hill States, Vol. I. 1st edition: Govt. Printing, Punjab, Lahore, 1933. Reprint 2000. Department of Language and Culture, Himachal Pradesh. Chapter IV Kangra State, pp. 98–198.

External links

"Kangra Valley", Kangra District official website.

Geography of Kangra district
Valleys of Himachal Pradesh